Charles Beach may refer to:

People 
 Beach Dickerson (1924–2005), American actor
 C. B. Hawley (1858–1915) American musician and composer
 Charles Beach (1881–1954), male model and inspiration for The Arrow Collar Man by J. C. Leyendecker
 Charles L. Beach (1866–1933), president of the University of Connecticut from 1908 to 1928

Places 
 Charles E. Beach House, historic house in West Hartford, Connecticut